59 Andromedae, abbreviated 59 And, is a sixth-magnitude binary star system in the northern constellation of Andromeda. 59 Andromedae is the Flamsteed designation. As of 2017, the pair had an angular separation of  along a position angle (PA) of 36°. Compare this to a separation of  along a PA of 35°, as measured in 1783.

The magnitude 6.09 primary component is a B-type main-sequence star with a stellar classification of B9 V. It has 2.73 times the Sun's radius and is radiating 84 times the Sun's luminosity from its photosphere at an effective temperature of 10,870 K. It is spinning with a projected rotational velocity of 176 km/s.

The secondary is a magnitude 6.82 A-type main-sequence star with a class of A1 Vn, where the 'n' suffix indicates "nebulous" lines due to rapid rotation. It is spinning with a high projected rotational velocity of 233 km/s. The star has 2.23 times the Sun's mass and 2.59 times the Sun's radius. It is radiating 30 times the luminosity of the Sun and has an effective temperature of 9,498 K.

References

External links
 Image 59 Andromedae

HR 628
HR 629
Binary stars
Andromeda (constellation)
Durchmusterung objects
Andromedae, 59
013294 5
010176
0628